Walter Reynolds (died 1327) was Bishop of Worcester and then Archbishop of Canterbury (1313–1327) as well as Lord High Treasurer and Lord Chancellor.

Early career

Reynolds was the son of a baker from Windsor, Berkshire, and became a clerk, or chaplain, in the service of Edward I.

Reynolds held several livings and, owing perhaps to his acting skill, he became a prime favourite with the Prince of Wales, afterwards Edward II, whom he served as Keeper of the Great Wardrobe. Just after the prince became king, on 22 August 1307 Reynolds, was appointed Treasurer of England.

On 13 November 1307 Reynolds, who had the living of St Mary's Church, Wimbledon was elected Bishop of Worcester and consecrated on 13 October 1308. He was also on 6 July 1310 named Keeper of the Great Seal and Lord Chancellor of England. Amongst his duties as Bishop of Worcester was to act as the patron and appoint the headmaster of the school that later became the Royal Grammar School Worcester.

Reynolds was one of the godfathers of the future Edward III when the prince was christened on 17 November 1312.

Episcopate 
When Robert Winchelsea, Archbishop of Canterbury, died in May 1313 Edward II convinced Pope Clement V to appoint his favourite to the vacant archbishopric, and Reynolds was enthroned at Canterbury Cathedral in January 1314 as the 51st Archbishop.

Although the private life of the new archbishop appears to have been the reverse of exemplary, he attempted to carry out some very necessary reforms in his new official capacity; he also continued the struggle for precedence, which had been carried on for many years between the archbishops of Canterbury and of York. In this connection in 1317 he laid London under an interdict after William de Melton, the Archbishop of York, had passed through its streets with his cross borne erect before him.

Reynolds remained in general loyal to Edward II until 1324, when with all his suffragans he opposed the king in defence of the Bishop of Hereford, Adam Orleton. He then fought with Edward II over liturgical issues, and sent sums of money to Queen Isabella in her rebellion against the King. Having fled for safety into Kent he returned to London and declared for Edward III, whom he crowned on 1 February 1327. He was appointed as a member of the regency council for Edward III that was formed in February 1327. In 1327 Reynolds popularised in England the political argument of vox populi, vox Dei, contrary to Alcuin's original warning to Charlemagne to resist such arguments, as the title of his sermon laying charges against Edward II.

Reynolds died at Mortlake on 16 November 1327.

Citations

References

External links
 List of Keepers from Office of Constitutional Affairs

Lord chancellors of England
Archbishops of Canterbury
Bishops of Worcester
14th-century English Roman Catholic archbishops
People from Windsor, Berkshire
13th-century births
1327 deaths
Lord High Treasurers of England
Burials at Canterbury Cathedral

Year of birth unknown